Phosphorus iodide may refer to any of the following:

Diphosphorus tetraiodide, P2I4
Phosphorus triiodide, PI3

See phosphorus halides for a complete list of phosphorus halides.